Artur Sergeyevich Smolyaninov (born 27 October 1983) is a Russian actor.

Biography
Smolyaninov was born on October 27, 1983 in Moscow. His mother Maria Vladimirovna is an art teacher. The godfather of Artur is Ivan Okhlobystin. He spent his childhood and youth in the city of Korolyov, Moscow Region. Artur has two younger brothers and a sister.

Smolyaninov's cinematic debut was at the age of fourteen in the 1998 film Who, if Not We by Valeriy Priemykhov.

After completing external school at the age of 16, he entered the Russian Institute of Theatre Arts at the acting section of the directing department (course of Leonid Kheifets) at the age of 16, and in 2004 graduated from it with almost a dozen credits in films and on television.

After his acting debut in Who, if Not We, he played in the movie Triumph. The role of Liuto in the film about the Afghan war The 9th Company brought wide popularity to the actor.

Artur Smolyaninov was accepted into the troupe of the Sovremennik Theatre in 2006. In his theatrical performances, he played the father in Family Situations by Biljana Srbljanović, Vikhorev in Stay in Your Own Sled by Alexander Ostrovsky.

Afterwards he had the roles of Soleny in the play "Three Sisters" by Anton Chekhov, the Danish king in "Once Again about the Naked King" Leonid Filatov, Pompey and Gonets in the play "Antony & Cleopatra. Version" of Oleg Bogayev and Kirill Serebrennikov based on the works of William Shakespeare, Prince Gialmar in "Malen" by Maurice Maeterlinck.

Artur Smolyaninov played the main role of ambulance doctor Oleg Samarin in the television series Samara which premiered in 2012 and lasted for two seasons.

In October 2022, Smolyaninov was charged for discrediting the Russian armed forces after making statements against the 2022 Russian invasion of Ukraine; he had also fled the country. He commented: "The laws of this state do not exist for me. They, like the state itself, are inherently criminal, which means they have neither moral nor legal force".

In January 2023, Smolyaninov was charged after allegedly making "anti-Russian" comments in an interview with Novaya Gazeta Europe. In the interview, he had stated that he would fight for Ukraine, not Russia, if he was forced to take part in the war.

Philanthropy
Artur Smolyaninov is a member of the Board of Trustees of the Give Life Foundation, organized by Chulpan Khamatova and Dina Korzun, which helps children with oncohematological diseases, and Galchonok, which helps children with organic lesions of the central nervous system. Repeatedly participated in charitable events. Took part in the competitive ice skating show Ice Age in 2014, paired with Olympic champion Tatiana Totmyanina.

Personal life
In 2013 he married the actress Darya Melnikova, in October 2015 the couple had a son, followed by a second son. On June 6, 2021, Melnikova announced her divorce from Smolyaninov.

Smolyaninov stated in October 2022 that he was no longer living in Russia.

Filmography

Dubbing roles

References

External links

 

1983 births
Living people
Male actors from Moscow
Russian activists against the 2022 Russian invasion of Ukraine
People listed in Russia as foreign agents
Russian male film actors
Russian male television actors